Eva Charlotte Dahlgren (born 9 June 1960) is a Swedish pop musician and singer-songwriter.

Career
Dahlgren was discovered by musician/producer Bruno Glenmark in 1978 after appearing on the TV show Sveriges magasin and her debut album Finns det nån som bryr sej om was released the same year. In 1979 she placed third in Melodifestivalen (the tryout competition for the Eurovision Song Contest in Sweden). 
She toured Sweden in 1987 with Swedish pop duo Roxette, a tour that was attended by more than 100,000 people. Dahlgren's career grew steadily with several album releases during the 1980s but her definite breakthrough in Sweden came in 1991 with En blekt blondins hjärta, her most successful album, which sold over half a million copies and won her five Grammis awards.

Dahlgren composed the score for the film Ingrid Bergman: In My Own Words (2015).

Personal life
In 1996 Dahlgren made headlines in the Swedish press when she came out as a lesbian through her civil union with jewellery designer Efva Attling, whom she met when she moved to Stockholm in the early 1980s. In connection with the civil union, Dahlgren changed her surname to Dahlgren-Attling. In 2009 they went through a marriage ceremony, after Sweden passed its gender neutral marriage law.

Discography

Albums

Live albums

Charting compilation albums

Extended plays

Charting singles

References

External links

Eva Dahlgren Online 
Official web site 

1960 births
Lesbian singers
Lesbian songwriters
Swedish LGBT singers
Swedish LGBT songwriters
Swedish lesbian musicians
Swedish LGBT rights activists
Living people
Melodifestivalen contestants
People from Umeå
Swedish women children's writers
Swedish pop singers
Swedish women songwriters
20th-century Swedish women singers
20th-century Swedish LGBT people
21st-century Swedish LGBT people
21st-century Swedish women singers